Little Miss Marker is a 1980 American comedy-drama film written and directed by Walter Bernstein and based on a short story by Damon Runyon. It stars Walter Matthau, Tony Curtis, Julie Andrews, Bob Newhart and new arrival Sara Stimson. The film is a remake of the 1934 film of the same name starring Shirley Temple and Adolphe Menjou.

Plot
In the 1930s, Sorrowful Jones is a gloomy, cantankerous bookie who is confronted by Carter, a gambler who cannot pay a $10 debt. Carter gives his six-year-old daughter to Sorrowful's gangster-run gambling operation as a "marker" (collateral) for a bet. When Carter loses his bet and commits suicide, the gangsters are left with the girl on their hands. Sorrowful's nervous assistant Regret is concerned about the legality of the arrangement, which might violate kidnapping statutes.

In the interim, a crime boss named Blackie coerces his longtime rival Sorrowful into financing a new gambling joint. It is opened in the stately home of Blackie's girlfriend, the widowed Amanda Worthington, who needs money to repurchase her family property. Amanda is also counting on her racehorse Sir Galahad to ride to her rescue. While the girl's personal needs inconvenience Sorrowful, a father-daughter relationship develops and they become inseparable.

Cast
 Walter Matthau as Sorrowful Jones
 Julie Andrews as Amanda Worthington
 Tony Curtis as Blackie
 Bob Newhart as Regret
 Sara Stimson as the Kid
 Brian Dennehy as Herbie
 Kenneth McMillan as Brannigan
 Nedra Volz as Mrs. Clancy
 Lee Grant as the Judge
 Andrew Rubin as Carter, the Kid's father
 Ralph Manza as the Casino Worker
 Jack DeLeon as the Building Superintendent

Award nominations
In 1981, Sara Stimson was nominated for the female Young Artist Award in the category of Best Major Motion Picture - Family Entertainment. Stimson lost to Diane Lane for her performance in Touched by Love. Little Miss Marker is Stimson's only acting credit.

Notes
Earlier remakes of Little Miss Marker included 1949 Paramount's Sorrowful Jones with Bob Hope and Lucille Ball, followed in 1962 by 40 Pounds of Trouble, which also featured Tony Curtis in a modified Sorrowful Jones role.

References

External links
 
 
 
 

1980 films
1980 comedy-drama films
American comedy-drama films
Remakes of American films
Films about children
Films based on short fiction
Films scored by Henry Mancini
Films set in 1934
Films with screenplays by Walter Bernstein
American horse racing films
Universal Pictures films
1980 directorial debut films
1980s English-language films
1980s American films